McGinness Airport  (also known as McGinness Field) is a closed public-use private airport located one mile from Columbia, Pennsylvania. It had been active from December 1949 till Spring 2014.

References

External links 
 List of Pennsylvania airports  at Pennsylvania DOT Bureau of Aviation
 Aerial image as of April 1999 from USGS The National Map
 

Defunct airports in Pennsylvania
Transportation buildings and structures in Lancaster County, Pennsylvania